Narpala is a village in Anantapur district of the Indian state of Andhra Pradesh. It is the mandal headquarters of Narpala mandal in Anantapur revenue division. Narpala is located 23 km from Anantapur. Famous Gugudu kullai swamy temple is in Narpala Mandal only.

Transport : From Anantapur for  every 15mins APSRTC palle velugu  buses are available. 

From DHARMAVARAM and TADIPATHRI for every 30mins  APSRTC palle velugu buses are available

Crops : Mainly Ground nut Banana Mango Sweet lime.

References 

Villages in Anantapur district
Mandal headquarters in Anantapur district